Louis-Eugène-Aduire Parrot (November 11, 1871 – November 18, 1948) was a Canadian physician and politician.

Born in Sainte-Emmélie, near Lotbinière, Quebec, Parrot studied at the Séminaire de Québec and the Université Laval. He became a physician in 1897 and practised general medicine in Deschaillons from 1897 to 1905. He did a surgery internship in Paris in 1905 and 1906. Returning to Quebec, he was a physician and surgeon in Fraserville (Rivière-du-Loup) from 1907 to 1939.

Parrot was elected to the Legislative Assembly of Quebec for Témiscouata in 1916. A Liberal, he was acclaimed in 1919. He resigned in 1921. He was defeated as the Liberal candidate for the House of Commons of Canada in a 1924 by-election in Témiscouata losing to Jean-François Pouliot.

He died in Quebec City in 1948.

References

1871 births
1948 deaths
Physicians from Quebec
Liberal Party of Canada candidates for the Canadian House of Commons
People from Chaudière-Appalaches
Quebec Liberal Party MNAs
Université Laval alumni